James William Lindeman (born January 10, 1962) is a former Major League Baseball player. He played mostly in the outfield and at first base, appearing in parts of nine seasons in the majors from 1986 until 1994.

Professional career 
He was the St. Louis Cardinals' first-round draft pick in the 1983 Major League Baseball Draft out of Bradley University. In 1986, he led the AAA Louisville Redbirds with 82 runs, 38 doubles, 20 home runs, and a league-leading 96 RBIs. He made his major league debut with the Cardinals in 1986, and played with them through the 1989 season. He saw the most playing time of his major league career in 1987, setting career highs in games played (75), at bats (207), hits (43), home runs (8) and RBI (28). Filling in for the injured Jack Clark, he batted .308 with a home run in the NLCS against the Giants and hit .333 in the World Series against the Twins.

Over the next five seasons he played for four different teams, never playing in more than 75 games in a season in his career. His final professional season was spent with the minor league Oklahoma City 89ers, a Texas Rangers farm team, in 1995.

Personal life 
Lindeman currently lives in Elk Grove Village, Illinois with his wife and four children. He teaches P.E. at Rolling Meadows High School and coached the baseball team and the freshmen basketball B team. He currently coaches freshman golf.

Notes

External links 

Major League Baseball outfielders
Major League Baseball first basemen
St. Louis Cardinals players
Detroit Tigers players
Philadelphia Phillies players
Houston Astros players
New York Mets players
St. Petersburg Cardinals players
Bradley Braves baseball players
Springfield Cardinals players
Arkansas Travelers players
Louisville Redbirds players
Toledo Mud Hens players
Scranton/Wilkes-Barre Red Barons players
Tucson Toros players
Norfolk Tides players
Oklahoma City 89ers players
Baseball players from Illinois
1962 births
Living people
Sportspeople from Evanston, Illinois